Dirty is a 2005 American crime drama film directed by Chris Fisher. The film stars Cuba Gooding Jr. and Clifton Collins Jr. The film was released in the United States on November 9, 2005.

Plot 

Officer Armando Sancho (Clifton Collins, Jr.) is a former Mal Creado ("Badly Raised") gang member who is forced to choose between his conscience and his loyalty. Recruited into an undercover, anti-gang unit of the LAPD, Sancho brings his street smarts onto the force that he has sworn to protect. With his partner Salim Adel (Cuba Gooding Jr.), the two patrol LA's streets the only way they know how—with force.

Cast

Production

It is set and filmed in Hollywood, Los Angeles, and Venice Beach, California on January 4 and February 1, 2005.

Home media

DVD was released in Region 1 in the United States on April 4, 2006, and also Region 2 in the United Kingdom on 5 June 2006, it was distributed by Sony Pictures Home Entertainment

Reception
The review aggregation website Rotten Tomatoes gives the film a score of 21%, based on 28 reviews, with an average rating of 4.4 out of 10. The website's consensus reads, "Dirty is an unoriginal L.A. cop drama that wears its tired influences on its sleeves."

References

External links
 
 
 
 

2005 films
2005 crime drama films
2000s gang films
American crime drama films
American gang films
American police detective films
Films about drugs
Films directed by Chris Fisher
Films set in California
Films set in Los Angeles
2000s English-language films
2000s American films